In Greek mythology, Leucothoe (Ancient Greek: Λευκοθόη) may refer to the following figures:

 Leucothoe, the Nereid of the sea's brine and one of the fifty marine-nymph daughters of the Old Man of the Sea Nereus and the Oceanid Doris.
Leucothea or Leucothoe, name of Ino after becoming a sea-deity.
 Leucothoe, a daughter of Orchamus loved by Helios.

Notes

References 

 Gaius Julius Hyginus, Fabulae from The Myths of Hyginus translated and edited by Mary Grant. University of Kansas Publications in Humanistic Studies. Online version at the Topos Text Project.
Hyginus, Gaius Julius, Fabulae in Apollodorus' Library and Hyginus' Fabulae: Two Handbooks of Greek Mythology, Translated, with Introductions by R. Scott Smith and Stephen M. Trzaskoma, Hackett Publishing Company,  2007. .
 Ovid. Metamorphoses, Volume I: Books 1-8. Translated by Frank Justus Miller. Revised by G. P. Goold. Loeb Classical Library No. 42. Cambridge, Massachusetts: Harvard University Press, 1977, first published 1916. . Online version at Harvard University Press.
 Parada, Carlos, Genealogical Guide to Greek Mythology, Jonsered, Paul Åströms Förlag, 1993. .
 Propertius, Elegies Edited and translated by G. P. Goold. Loeb Classical Library 18. Cambridge, Massachusetts: Harvard University Press, 1990. Online version at Harvard University Press.
Publius Ovidius Naso, Metamorphoses translated by Brookes More (1859-1942). Boston, Cornhill Publishing Co. 1922. Online version at the Perseus Digital Library.
Publius Ovidius Naso, Metamorphoses. Hugo Magnus. Gotha (Germany). Friedr. Andr. Perthes. 1892. Latin text available at the Perseus Digital Library.
Sextus Propertius, Elegies from Charm. Vincent Katz. trans. Los Angeles. Sun & Moon Press. 1995. Online version at the Perseus Digital Library. Latin text available at the same website.

Nereids
Princesses in Greek mythology